Aishani Shetty is an Indian actress and director, who works predominantly in the Kannada film industry. She made her break through the film Vaastu Prakaara in (2015) for she was nominated for  IIFA Utsavam Award for Best actress. She also acted in Rocket (2015), Naduve Antaravirali (2018) and Dharani Madala Madhyadolage (2022).

Early life and education 
Aishani is from Bangalore. She completed her schooling in Bishop Cotton Girls' School and pursued her Under- Graduation in Jyoti Nivas College, Bangalore. Aishani has a Master's degree in Mass Communication and Journalism from St Joseph's College, Bangalore.

Career

Actress

Aishani made her break in the Kannada Film Industry with the film Vaastu Prakaara directed by Yogaraj Bhat in the year 2015. She was nominated for Best Actress in a leading role IIFA Utsavam for the same. She went on to act in Rocket (film) opposite Sathish Ninasam which was released in November 2015. Rocket (film) marked her debut as singer, where she rendered the female voice  opposite Puneeth Rajkumar for the song 'Thannage Idvi'. Aishani took a short break from films while pursuing her master's degree. During this period she acted in Kannada romantic drama Naduve Antaravirali. In 2022, she appeared in the film Dharani Mandala Madhyadolage.

Director

Along with her acting career Aishani made her debut as a director with the short film 'Kaaji'. Her directorial debut was officially screened at several international film festivals in 2017 including Bangalore Shorts Film Festival, Pink City International Film Festival. Kaaji won several awards including Best Film award at SIIMA and Best Debutant Director award Pink City International Film Festival.

Filmography

Films

As director

Awards

References

External links 
 

1995 births
Living people
Actresses from Mangalore
Indian film actresses
Actresses in Kannada cinema
Indian television actresses
Kannada people
21st-century Indian actresses
Filmfare Awards South winners